Webb is a town in Houston County, Alabama, United States. It is named for plantation owner B. F. Webb, who settled in the area around 1890. The town was incorporated in 1903. It is part of the Dothan, Alabama Metropolitan Statistical Area. As of the 2010 census, the population was 1,430, up from 1,298 in 2000.

Geography
Webb is located in northern Houston County at  (31.260358, -85.283533). It is bordered to the northwest by the town of Kinsey, to the west by the city of Dothan, and at its southern tip by the town of Cowarts.

Alabama State Route 52 passes through Webb, leading west  into Dothan and east  to Columbia at the Georgia border.

Demographics

2000 census
At the 2000 census there were 1,298 people, 491 households, and 375 families in the town. The racial makeup of the town was 79.20% White, 19.65% Black or African American, 0.31% Native American, and 0.85% from two or more races. 1.00% of the population were Hispanic or Latino of any race.
Of the 491 households 38.1% had children under the age of 18 living with them, 61.9% were married couples living together, 11.4% had a female householder with no husband present, and 23.6% were non-families. 22.6% of households were one person and 8.6% were one person aged 65 or older. The average household size was 2.63 and the average family size was 3.06.

The age distribution was 28.1% under the age of 18, 8.1% from 18 to 24, 29.7% from 25 to 44, 23.7% from 45 to 64, and 10.5% 65 or older. The median age was 35 years. For every 100 females, there were 92.3 males. For every 100 females age 18 and over, there were 88.9 males.

The median household income was $31,364 and the median family income  was $36,667. Males had a median income of $32,656 versus $19,479 for females. The per capita income for the town was $15,150. About 13.7% of families and 17.0% of the population were below the poverty line, including 22.4% of those under age 18 and 16.9% of those age 65 or over.

2010 census
At the 2010 census there were 1,430 people, 544 households, and 391 families in the town. The racial makeup of the town was 74.8% White, 18.7% Black or African American, 0.7% Native American, and 1.5% from two or more races. 6.2% of the population were Hispanic or Latino of any race.
Of the 544 households 28.5% had children under the age of 18 living with them, 52.0% were married couples living together, 14.5% had a female householder with no husband present, and 28.1% were non-families. 22.1% of households were one person and 7.9% were one person aged 65 or older. The average household size was 2.60 and the average family size was 3.05.

The age distribution was 24.0% under the age of 18, 8.0% from 18 to 24, 27.6% from 25 to 44, 26.9% from 45 to 64, and 13.6% 65 or older. The median age was 39.1 years. For every 100 females, there were 98.6 males. For every 100 females age 18 and over, there were 98.4 males.

The median household income was $34,650 and the median family income  was $38,352. Males had a median income of $32,847 versus $18,938 for females. The per capita income for the town was $15,124. About 13.2% of families and 15.4% of the population were below the poverty line, including 20.2% of those under age 18 and 13.7% of those age 65 or over.

2020 census

As of the 2020 United States census, there were 1,270 people, 481 households, and 330 families residing in the town.

References

External links
Town of Webb unofficial website

Towns in Houston County, Alabama
Towns in Alabama
Dothan metropolitan area, Alabama